"Love's Theme" is an instrumental piece written by Barry White in around 1965. Recorded and released as a single by White's The Love Unlimited Orchestra in 1973, it was one of the few instrumental and purely orchestral singles to reach #1 on the Billboard Hot 100 chart in the United States, which it did in early 1974. Billboard ranked it as the #3 song for 1974.

The song was included on two albums: 1973's Under the Influence of... Love Unlimited (by the vocal group Love Unlimited) and 1974's Rhapsody in White by the Love Unlimited Orchestra. Love Unlimited would re-release the song for their next album In Heat only this time with different arrangements and lyrics written by Aaron Schroeder.

The recording (with a large string orchestra, modified guitar and big rhythm) was considered to be an influence on the disco sound, which would increase popularity the following year. The song was also popular on the Adult Contemporary chart in the United States (spending two weeks at #1) and was also a #1 on Cash Box.

In Canada, the single was similarly successful, being a #1 on the RPM 100 National Singles Chart on March 2, 1974.

Charts and certifications

Weekly charts

The Love Unlimited Orchestra

Andy Williams

Year-end charts

Certifications

Cover versions & samples
"Love's Theme" was recorded in its first vocal version by Love Unlimited (on their 1974 album In Heat). 
Andy Williams released a vocal version in May 1974 that reached No. 16 on the adult contemporary chart in the United States.
Enoch Light recorded an electro-disco instrumental version on his 1977 album, Disco Disque. The song is also part of 
Meco's instrumental medley "Hooked On Instrumentals Part I" (from the 1985 album Hooked On Instrumentals). 
In May 1993, Orchestral Manoeuvres in the Dark released the single "Dream of Me (Based on Love's Theme)" (from their album Liberator, released the same year) which used a sample of this Barry White composition; it reached No. 24 on the UK Singles Chart, with a writing credit from Barry White.

In popular culture
"Love's Theme" was also used by ABC Sports for many years as the opening theme music for its golf coverage. 
New York television station WPIX used it as the closing music for its then-Action News franchise during the mid-1970s.
The Hong Kong-based Cathay Pacific Airways used the music for their TV advertisements. 
"Love's Theme" was also featured briefly in Mean Girls, Despicable Me 2, El Cantante, Goodbye Bruce Lee: His Last Game of Death and The SpongeBob Movie: Sponge Out of Water.
"Love's Theme" was also used as the opening theme for the Brazilian telenovela  and as the opening and closing theme of the Italian reality program .
Seven Network's music video show Sounds Unlimited used the song as its opening and closing theme.

See also
List of Hot 100 number-one singles of 1974 (U.S.)
List of number-one adult contemporary singles of 1974 (U.S.)
List of RPM number-one singles of 1974 (Canada)

References

External links 

1973 debut singles
1973 songs
1970s instrumentals
Songs written by Barry White
Barry White songs
Andy Williams songs
Billboard Hot 100 number-one singles
Cashbox number-one singles
RPM Top Singles number-one singles
Number-one singles in South Africa
Sports television theme songs
Music television series theme songs
Pop instrumentals
ABC Sports
20th Century Fox Records singles
Pye Records singles